The 1990 Cal State Hayward Pioneers football team represented California State University, Hayward—now known as California State University, East Bay—as a member of the Northern California Athletic Conference (NCAC) during the 1990 NCAA Division II football season. Led by 16th-year head coach Tim Tierney, Cal State Hayward compiled an overall record of 2–9 with a mark of 1–4 in conference play, placing in a three-way tie for fourth in the NCAC. The team was outscored by its opponents 326 to 159 for the season. The Pioneers played home games at Pioneer Stadium in Hayward, California.

Schedule

Notes

References

Cal State Hayward
Cal State Hayward Pioneers football seasons
Cal State Hayward Pioneers football